The Alliance Against Sexual Coercion (AASC), established in June 1976 by Freada Kapor Klein, Lynn Wehrli, and Elizabeth Cohn-Stuntz, was among the first US organizations to organize against sexual harassment and severe sexual coercion experienced by working women. They argued that sexual harassment toward women holds the idea/ stereotype that women are less than men making it harder for women in the work place. Many feminist groups worked toward gaining right, but these rights were only useful to white women. Black women were effected a lot because of their Intersectionality. These women were subjected to racism and sexism making them one of the major works of AASC.

History/Objectives 
The Alliance Against Sexual Sexual Coercion organization was originally founded in Cambridge, Massachusetts. The womenhad experience dealing with sexual harassment claims due to their work at the Washington D.C. Rape Crisis Center. Klein, Wehrli, and Cohn-Stuntz were able to take more of an intersectional approach.

Back to the 1900s, sexual harassment had been part of women's working life. Some women working unions' organizers did not take action to solve the sexual harassment but to blame the victims. There is still some exceptions, in the first director of the Women's Bureau of the U.S. department of labor: Mary Anderson's autobiography, she described that women carried knives to protect themselves from foremen, and the strike they had leads to fire of the foremen and an increase in their wages.

AASC Hotline 
Meyer and Sauvigne, friends of radical activist Lin Farley combined their efforts in summer of 1978, to create a National Information and Referral Service with the help of a $6,500 grant from the city of New York. These women had experience working on the issue of rape at the Washington, D.C., Rape Crisis Center, and there the issue of sexual harassment in work environment was brought to light. The hotline's service provided emotional support, as well as advice regarding situations of sexual harassment. The Hotline's ability to grant referrals to attorneys and crisis counselors for those who call contributes to its supportive design. The hotline shift revealed the many phone calls from women who were experiencing severe sexual coercion on the job aiding in the creation of AASC. As an organization determined to eliminate sexual harassment in the workplace, it was established that the hotline was not enough to address the needs of these women. Although supportive, listening to stories was not enough to inflict the change AASC aimed for, here, legal dimensions of sexual harassment within the workplace began to be considered.
   
In a publication by Freada Klein and Lynn Wehrli, they analyze how the increasing accounts of sexual coercion on the job is indicative of legal reform. They add that to contribute to the women's feminist movement and legal reform, that is through raising awareness and providing adequate attention to the societal issues needing sed legal reform such as sexual harassment. Its legal definitions of rape not including or providing other definitions of more subtle forms of sexual harassment sets the tone that one can be sexually harassed with no consequence. It is the Williams v. Saxbe Case that is the first case to validate the harassment of women under gender discrimination, setting change to the perception of workplace sexual activity.

Legal Options 
The AASC proposed several options for taking action against sexual harassment that women experience at the workplace: laws to protect women in the workplace and punishing the perpetrators who have so often gotten away with these acts. The group was able to acknowledge, in their publications, however, the ways in which legal cases would be limiting if an intersectional approach was not taken, looking at the ways in which race, class, and socio-economic status overlap in sexual harassment instances. This approach implies that black and brown men are more likely to be accused and convicted than their white, more privileged counterparts. The AASC intersectional approach focused on changing male opinions on inequality towards women in the workplace instead of making women change the ways in which they live their lives. There were two significant sexual harassment in the workplace cases which made their way to the Federal Courts: Corne v. Bausch & Lomb, Inc. and Williams v. Saxbe.

Corne v. Bausch & Lomb, Inc. Case 
This case, which was brought to the U.S. District Court for the District of Arizona on March 14, 1975, was filed by Jane Corne, Geneva Devane, and other plaintiffs against the Bausch & Lomb Company. The complaint alleged the violation of civil rights based on sex discrimination. The case was dismissed in the end, as it was stated that the accusers were not able to report in a timely manner through other state channels, the behavior was proclaimed as a personal grudge towards the women, not based on race or sex, and the activity was interpreted as being too broad for the Title VII of the Civil Rights Act.

Williams v. Saxbe Case

Publications 
Members of the AASC published many materials spreading awareness about the issue of sexual harassment and sharing their own theoretical analyses on the issue. By doing so, their publications were especially able to create a community of women who were not only against sexual harassment but also educated about its history, context within social structures, and relation to the law.

First Position Paper 
In October 1976, founders Klein and Wehrli published the AASC's first position paper. This piece pioneered the linking of sexual coercion to economic power by highlighting a number of examples proving the gendered disadvantage women face in the workforce from employers and co-workers alike. Several important points were constructed in the paper including the parallels between rape and sexual harassment, positioning of the issue of sexual coercion in feminist activism, and the dearth of legal protection for women workers.

1977 Brochure 
After obtaining a grant from Wellesley College's Center for Research on Women in Higher Education and the Professions, members Rags Brophy, Mary Bularzik, Martha Hooven, Freada Klein, Liz Cohn-Stuntz, and Lynn Wehrli collectively created the organization's first informational brochure on sexual harassment in 1977. This 23-page brochure was sent out in informational packets that included flyers advertising the AASC, templates on how to address harassers, and their first Position Paper. Grounded in the argument that "sexual harassment was a form of violence against women that reflected and reinforced women's subordinate status in society", one of the two main components of the publication was advice for women facing harassment in and out of the workplace. The publication raised awareness of sexual harassment by educating readers about various aspects of the issue including its history in the U.S. and the enduring impacts on economically vulnerable women. In addition to providing such guidelines and information, the publication also served as a platform to share the organization's criticism on U.S. capitalism which they viewed to be responsible for producing a racist and sexist society.

Intersectionality

Critique of Capitalism 
Through their writing, AASC members frequently demonstrated their understanding of sexual harassment in the context of "a system of related oppressions" by highlighting the role of capitalism in the continued disadvantaging of women. In one article titled "The Role of Capitalism: Understanding Sexual Harassment", members Martha Hooven and Nancy McDonald provided a detailed introduction to this relationship. Along with definitions for both sexual harassment and capitalism, Hooven and McDonald included data collected by the U.S. Department of Labor to prove the existence of a double standard for women workers that disadvantage them. Going further, Hooven and McDonald state that " capitalism feeds quite nicely on sexism and racism" when overviewing the additional challenges for minority workers. In the final words of their article, Hooven and McDonald conclude on a question centered by the AASC as whole: can an issue like sexual harassment truly be resolved without abolishing capitalism?.

References 

Advocacy groups in the United States
Sexual harassment in the United States